Tashan (also Romanized as Tashān; also known as Tashshān) is a village in Tashan Rural District of Riz District, Jam County, Bushehr province, Iran. At the 2006 census, its population was 1,099 in 241 households. The following census in 2011 counted 1,318 people in 302 households. The latest census in 2016 showed a population of 1,234 people in 338 households; it was the largest village in its rural district.

References 

Populated places in Jam County